Taki Government College is a public undergraduate college with about 6,000(Regular) & 3000 (Casual) students located in Taki, West Bengal, India. The full-time professors of the college are appointed by the Government of West Bengal according to the recommendation specified by the University Grants Commission (India).

Courses Offered

Under Graduate Courses

Arts
Bengali
English
Sanskrit
Philosophy
History
Political Science
Economics

Science

Mathematics
Chemistry
Physics
Botany
Zoology
Economics
Geography

Post Graduate Courses
Bengali
English

Affiliation
The college was initially affiliated under the University of Calcutta but from the academic session of 2008-2009 it has been affiliated with the newly formed West Bengal State University.

See also
Education in India
List of colleges in West Bengal
Education in West Bengal

References

External links
http://www.tgc.ac.in/

Universities and colleges in North 24 Parganas district
Colleges affiliated to West Bengal State University
Educational institutions established in 1950
1950 establishments in West Bengal